Thea Altaras (19242004) was a Croatian-German architect who was known for her research and publications on Jewish monuments in Hesse, Germany.

Early life 
Altaras was born in Zagreb, Croatia on 11 March 1924. She was raised in a wealthy Croatian-Jewish family of; her parents were Žiga and Alma Fuhrmann. During World War II Altaras was imprisoned with her mother and sister Jelka, at the Rab concentration camp. After the capitulation of Italy and the liberation of the camp, Altaras joined the Partisans with her mother and sister.

Education
After the war, she returned to Zagreb and became a member of the Communist Party of Croatia. She finished high school and then attended the Faculty of Architecture at the University of Zagreb, graduating in 1953. Afterwards, she worked as an architect in Zagreb and later completed her academic studies in Paris, France. Upon her return to Zagreb, she married Jakob Altaras. In 1960 their only daughter Adriana was born. In 1964 her husband was forced to leave Zagreb for Zurich, Switzerland under League of Communists of Croatia persecution.

To Germany
In 1964, Altaras escaped to Italy thanks to her brother-in-law who smuggled her and her daughter into the country. From Italy she moved to Konstanz, Germany where she worked  at the Municipal building department of Konstanz. For three years Altaras traveled between Konstanz and Zurich, where her husband worked. In 1968 she received German citizenship. She helped her husband to found the revived Jewish community in Giessen in 1978.

Achievements and awards
Altaras researched the architectural remains of the former synagogues in Hesse. In 1989 she received the honorary doctorate at the University of Giessen in recognition for her research on Judaism in Hesse. In 1995 she was rewarded with the Hedwig-Burgheim-Medaille for her contributions. Altaras was also awarded with the Order of Merit of the Federal Republic of Germany. She received worldwide attention due to her research and publications about the fate of the destroyed Jewish community in Hesse from 1933 to 1945. During her career she published several books about Judaism. She died in Giessen on 28 September 2004.

Published works
 Stätten der Juden in Gießen, Königstein i. Ts., 1998, 
 Synagogen in Hessen – Was geschah seit 1945?,  Königstein i. Ts., 1988, 
 Synagogen und jüdische Rituelle Tauchbäder und: Synagogen in Hessen – Was geschah seit 1945? Teil II,  Königstein i. Ts., 1994, 
 Synagogen und jüdische rituelle Tauchbäder in Hessen – Was geschah seit 1945?, Die Blauen Bücher, Königstein i. Ts., Verlag Langewiesche, 2007,

References

Bibliography 
 
 

1924 births
2004 deaths
Architects from Zagreb
Croatian Jews
20th-century German Jews
Faculty of Architecture, University of Zagreb alumni
20th-century German architects
Jewish architects
Croatian communists
Yugoslav Partisans members
Croatian people of World War II
Yugoslav emigrants to Germany
Recipients of the Cross of the Order of Merit of the Federal Republic of Germany
Rab concentration camp survivors
Jewish socialists
German women architects
Women in the Yugoslav Partisans
Jews in the Yugoslav Partisans
Holocaust survivors
Altaras family
Female anti-fascists